The Nokia 2630, released in Q2 2007, is a mobile phone developed by Nokia.

The 2630 is a basic but decent and feature-packed phone containing all the features of its predecessor Nokia 2610, including a VGA camera and improved design and display. It was notable for being the thinnest Nokia phone at the time, less than one centimetre thick, and with tiny dimensions overall and a very low weight of 66 grams.

It was manufactured at Nokia factories in Romania and China.

Design
The 2630 is a candybar style phone that weighs 66 grams, with its buttons operated by the thumb. It has a 1.8 inch TFT color screen with 65536 colors display all the information of the cellphone. Uses a d-pad and two selection button on each side with a send and end key like native S40 devices. The End key is also used to turn the phone on/off. The phone also has a 640x480 pixels, VGA camera phone on the back.

Specifications

Imaging
 640x480 pixels, VGA camera phone
 0.3 megapixel
 3 sizes
640x480
320x240
160x120
 x4 digital zoom
 128x96 pixels video recording
 Night Mode
 Multishot

Networks
GSM 850, GSM 1900
EGSM 900, GSM 1800

Entertainment
 Radio
 MP3, AMR, MP4, 3GP, MIDI, WAV (16 kHz), 3GPP
 Three preinstalled games (which are Phantom Spider, Snake EX2 and Sudoku)

Connectivity
 Bluetooth
 EDGE

Software
 Series 40 user interface
 Java MIDP 2.0

Internet
 Email (POP3 and IMAP4). With Push e-mail available for IMAP4.

Display
 128x160 pixels
 1.8 inches-TFT
 65536 colors

Sar Value
 2.6g

See also
 Sony Ericsson W880i
 Nokia 6500 classic
 Nokia 5310 XpressMusic

External links

Official Nokia 2630 website
 Nokia Asia 
 Nokia Europe

References

Mobile phones introduced in 2007
2630

pt:Nokia 2630